During Suleiman's reign there were few major and several minor revolts throughout the Ottoman Empire. This is a list of the few major revolts.

Revolts

Notes
Citations

References
 
 

Suleiman
Suleiman the Magnificent
Ottoman Empire-related lists